Thomas Green (25 November 1893–1975) was an English footballer who played in the Football League for Accrington Stanley, Clapton Orient, Stockport County and West Ham United.

References

1893 births
1975 deaths
English footballers
Association football forwards
English Football League players
West Ham United F.C. players
Southport F.C. players
Accrington Stanley F.C. (1891) players
Stockport County F.C. players
Leyton Orient F.C. players
Heart of Midlothian F.C. players
Third Lanark A.C. players
Flint Town United F.C. players